Ovau Island is an island of the Shortland Islands archipelago, located in the Western Province of the Solomon Islands is the Pacific Ocean. The estimated terrain elevation above sea level is some 309 metres.

References

Islands of the Solomon Islands
Western Province (Solomon Islands)